Kilambi Ramanujachari (1852–1928), shortly K. Ramanujachari, was an Indian lawyer and administrator.

He impressed the Rajah immensely by performing Avadhanam (he was declared an Ashtavadhani and subsequently a Shatavadhani). The Rajah sponsored his further studies in Presidency College, Madras.

He was awarded the title of "Rao Bahadur" by the British Government in 1912. Andhra University awarded Honorary Doctorate (D.Litt.) to him in 1927.

References

19th-century Indian lawyers
1853 births
1928 deaths
20th-century Indian lawyers
Presidency College, Chennai alumni